Mak Rud (also Romanized as Mak Rūd; also known as Makā Rūd) is a village in Tameshkol Rural District, Nashta District, Tonekabon County, Mazandaran Province, Iran. At the 2006 census, its population was 244, in 67 families.

References 

Populated places in Tonekabon County